Severomorsk is a city in Murmansk Oblast, Russia.

Severomorsk may also refer to:
Severomorsk-1, an air base, Russia
A former name of Safonovo-1, an air base, Russia
Severomorsk-2, an air base, Russia
Severomorsk-3 (disambiguation)
Russian destroyer Severomorsk (:ru:Североморск (большой противолодочный корабль))